is a Japanese speed skater. He competed in two events at the 2010 Winter Olympics.

References

1982 births
Living people
Japanese male speed skaters
Olympic speed skaters of Japan
Speed skaters at the 2010 Winter Olympics
Sportspeople from Hokkaido
21st-century Japanese people